FV Commandant Bultinck was a Belgian Trawler that ran aground in a storm off Fleetwood, Lancashire, United Kingdom on 2 October 1929.

Construction 
Commandant Bultinck was built at the Smith's Dock Co. Ltd. shipyard in Middlesbrough, United Kingdom in 1911. Where she was launched and completed that same year.

Sinking 
Commandant Bultinck was sailing in the Irish Sea when on 2 October 1929, she got caught in a storm with winds up to 80 mph and lightning, which drove her to shore and ran her aground at Rossall Point near Fleetwood, Lancashire, United Kingdom barely missing a breakwater. She was spotted on the beach by a number of passengers on a tramcar at 11 pm, who quickly alerted the Fleetwood harbourmaster. The lifeboat headquarters at Blackpool were also informed of the wreck and chartered their lifeboat by horse to the wrecksite.

By the time the rescuers arrived, a large crowd had followed them to the site, where the harbourmaster said that the lifeboat would be useless as the wreck lay in very shallow waters surrounded by big waves. The rescuers waited on the shore until 4 am as they saw how another lifeboat with other rescuers tried in vain to reach the wreck before having to return to Fleetwood for shelter against the storm. Meanwhile the Commandant Bultinck endured wave after wave crashing over her deck as she lay broadside to the shore, with her crew holding onto the tilted deck. Ultimately a mate called Celestine Tratsaert (aged 23) attempted to swim for the shore while wearing a lifebelt and holding onto a rope which could be used afterwards to rescue the remaining 11 crewmen. He was however no match for the sea as he was swept under the stranded vessel and drowned.

The crew ended up attempting to reach shore a second time as an apprentice named Willie Van Yper (aged 17) and boatswain Pieter Luyens (aged 24) jumped into the sea while wearing lifebelts. The crowd, who was still present alongside the rescuers, could only watch as the two men struggled in the raging sea when they suddenly disappeared from sight, meeting the same fate as the mate before them.

By this time one of the teachers from the nearby Rossall School arrived on the scene with a megaphone. He was the only person who knew some Flemish and helped to communicate with the stricken Flemish crew who didn't know any English. The crew of Commandant Bultinck were reluctant to enter the water again as the two previous attempts failed and claimed the lives of three of their fellow crewmen. Instead they waited until low tide when the rescuers were finally able to reach the ship and assist the remaining crew into getting ashore. The nine surviving crewmen were taking to the Royal National Mission to Deep Sea Fishermen's Hostel in Fleetwood. The fish catch aboard Commandant Bultinck was also lost as all the ice aboard for preservation had been washed out by the seawater.

Wreck 
The wreck of Commandant Bultinck lay nearly completely dry at low tide, but several attempts to refloat her were made. But even after holes were cut in the ship to make her lighter, she still failed to be refloated. Ultimately Commandant Bultinck was scrapped on site.

References

1911 ships
Shipwrecks in the Irish Sea
Trawlers
Steamships of Belgium
Ships built in the United Kingdom
Maritime incidents in 1929
Fishing vessels